Levi David Addai (born 2 August 1983) is a British playwright and screenwriter. He is best known for the award-winning Damilola, Our Loved Boy, the critically acclaimed Youngers and his stage plays 93.2FM and Oxford Street.

Personal
Addai was born in South London to Ghanaian parents. He studied at Brunel University.

Plays 
Addai wrote his first play, 93.2FM, as part of the Royal Court Young Writers Programme. It was performed at Royal Court Theatre in 2005, and then revived in 2006 before touring to Cardiff, Birmingham, Liverpool and Brighton. In a Times review it was said that "There is an enormous generosity in Addai's writing.  He shows us the caring, supportive side of community.. this is a memorable and decidedly promising debut."

Addai's second play, House of Agnes, premiered in March 2008 at the Ovalhouse in a co-production with Paines Plough. A review in the Financial Times said "Addai writes his characters' most heartfelt emotions with the clarity and sincerity of a younger Richard Cameron."

Addai's third play, Oxford Street, starring Ashley Walters and Daniel Kaluuya 'premiered at the Royal Court in May 2008, before transferring for a limited run in Elephant and Castle shopping centre. The Times in a review said "All the tawdry dazzle of London's most famous shopping district glitters in the third play by the sharp-eyed young talent Levi David Addai... This is a joyous hymn to our flawed, fabulous city." Oxford Street was nominated for a Writers' Guild award in the "Best Play (Theatre)" category (2008); and was nominated for the "Outstanding Achievement in an Affiliate Theatre" category of the Olivier Award (2009).

His play for Polka Theatre, I Have A Dream, ran in September 2011. A new play, Blacklands, won the Alfred Fagon Award (2011).

Television 

In 2011, Addai wrote a short film, Micah, starring Daniel Kaluuya for the Channel 4 series Coming Up which highlights films made for television by new directors and writers. It was broadcast in August and screened at the Edinburgh Film Festival. The short led to his winning "Best Breakthrough Talent" at the CDN Diversity Awards (2011).

BBC Current Affairs commissioned Levi to write the drama My Murder starring John Boyega, based on a gang-related honey trap murder which premiered on BBC3 on 26 March 2012. My Murder won a Broadcast Awards (2013) in the "Best Single Drama" category; it won "Best Drama" at the Movie Video & Screen Awards (2012); it received a recognition at the 2012 Screen Nation Film and TV Awards for "Diversity in Drama Production"; and was nominated for "Best Single Drama" at the 2013 Royal Television Society awards.

Addai was lead writer, co-creator and associate producer of Youngers, an E4 critically acclaimed drama series, which was first broadcast on Channel 4 on 20 March 2013, and ran for two series. The Guardian in a review said, "Youngers has heart, conviction and a spring in its trainers so pneumatic it's surely only a matter of time before it crunks itself clean through the ceiling tiles". It was nominated for a Screen Nation Film and Television Awards for Diversity in Drama Production (2014), a Broadcast Award for Best Multichannel Programme (2014), and a BBC Radio 1 Teen Award for Best British TV show (2013).

Addai's 90-minute BBC One drama Damilola, Our Loved Boy, starring Babou Ceesay and Wunmi Mosaku, tells the story of Damilola Taylor from the point of view of the Taylor family. It won the Best Single Drama BAFTA TV Award and the Screen Nation Film and Television Award for Diversity in Drama Production. Other wins include the Banff Rockie Best Television Movie Award, the CDN Best Drama Award and the CDN Best Author/Creative Award. It was nominated for a BAFTA TV Award for Best Writer, a Broadcasting Press Guild Award for Best Single Drama, and the Banff Rockie Special Jury Prize. It has won at the inaugural Diversity Awards and at the Movie, Video & Screen Awards. Other nominations include best single drama for the Broadcast Awards 2018 and the RTS Awards 2018.

In 2016, the BBC announced they were producing an adaptation of acclaimed YA novels Noughts and Crosses, to be written by Addai, with Matthew Graham. They had to bow out and Toby Whithouse took over in 2018. Addai's four-part serial Dark Mon£y, starring Babou Ceesay and Jill Halfpenny, was first broadcast between 8 and 16 July 2019 on BBC One and on Netflix in 2022. It deals with the ordeal of a family of a sexual abuse victim.

References

External links
 

Living people
1983 births
English people of Ghanaian descent
British dramatists and playwrights
British male screenwriters
British male dramatists and playwrights
21st-century British dramatists and playwrights
21st-century British male writers
21st-century British screenwriters